Christopher William McDonald (born 14 October 1975) is a Scottish former footballer who played for Arsenal, Stoke City and Hartlepool United.

Career
McDonald was born in Edinburgh and began his career with Arsenal but failed to make the grade at Highbury and joined Stoke City in August 1995. He again failed to impress and spent the whole season in the reserves and joined Hartlepool United in the summer of 1996. He spent three seasons at Hartlepool making 20 league appearances.

Career statistics
Source:

References

1975 births
Living people
Scottish footballers
Association football midfielders
Arsenal F.C. players
Stoke City F.C. players
Hartlepool United F.C. players
English Football League players